Rosalío Cortés Sánchez (1820–1884) was the 35th President of Nicaragua, serving from 19 October to 15 November 1857; he ruled jointly with Gregorio Juárez in a government junta.

Cortés was born in 1820 in León, Nicaragua and died in 1884 in Masaya.

Presidents of Nicaragua
1820 births
1884 deaths
People from León, Nicaragua